The 1st constituency of Seine-et-Marne is a French legislative constituency in the Seine-et-Marne département.

Description

The 1st constituency of Seine-et-Marne is focused on the town of Melun on the border with Essonne. Boundary changes prior to the 2012 elections created two new seats in Seine-et-Marne one of which Seine-et-Marne's 11th constituency took the canton of Savigny-le-Temple from this seat.

Historically the seat has usually supported conservatives over the left with the exception of the period between 1973 and 1986 when it was held by Socialist Alain Vivien.

Historic Representation

Election results

2022

 
 
 
 
 
 
 
|-
| colspan="8" bgcolor="#E9E9E9"|
|-

2017

2012

2007

 
 
 
 
 
 
 
|-
| colspan="8" bgcolor="#E9E9E9"|
|-

2002

 
 
 
 
 
|-
| colspan="8" bgcolor="#E9E9E9"|
|-

1997

 
 
 
 
 
 
 
 
 
|-
| colspan="8" bgcolor="#E9E9E9"|
|-

Sources

Official results of French elections from 2002: "Résultats électoraux officiels en France" (in French).

1